Theta Draconis, a name Latinized from θ Draconis, is a binary star system in the northern circumpolar constellation of Draco. It is faintly visible to the naked eye at night with an apparent visual magnitude of 4.12. O. J. Eggen included this star as a member of the NGC 1901 supercluster based on its space motion.

The binary nature of this system was discovered by W. W. Campbell in 1899, and the first set of orbital elements was published by H. D. Curtis in 1907. It is a single-lined spectroscopic binary in a close orbit with a period of 3.07 days and an eccentricity (ovalness) of 0.04. Some velocity variation of K1 was observed by M. Mayor and T. Mazeh in 1987, which is suggestive of a tertiary component to the system.

The primary component is a solar-type star that at various times has been assigned stellar classifications of F9 V and F8IV-V. The star is about two billion years old and is spinning with a projected rotational velocity of 31 km/s. It has a high metallicity (heavy element abundances) with around 20% more mass than the Sun and nearly three times the Sun's radius. The star displays no chromospheric emission and may be on or entering the subgiant stage. Because of the close orbit, it could be filling up to 60% of its Roche lobe.

Chinese name

References

External links

F-type main-sequence stars
Spectroscopic binaries

Draco (constellation)
Draconis, Theta
Durchmusterung objects
Draconis, 13
144284
078527
5986